Na Rì is a rural district of Bắc Kạn province in the Northeast region of Vietnam. As of 2003 the district had a population of 38,833. The district covers an area of 834 km². The district capital lies at Yến Lạc.

Administrative divisions
The district is divided into one township, Yến Lạc (the district capital), and communes:

Đổng Xá
Liêm Thủy
Xuân Dương
Dương Sơn
Quang Phong
Hảo Nghĩa
Cư Lễ
Hữu Thác
Côn Minh
Văn Minh
Ân Tình
Lam Sơn
Kim Lư
Lương Thành
Lạng San
Kim Hỷ
Lương Thượng
Văn Học
Lương Hạ
Cường Lợi
Vũ Loan

References

Districts of Bắc Kạn province